Charles Ernest Rosenberg (born 1936) is an American historian of medicine. He is Professor of the History of Science and Medicine and the Ernest E. Monrad Professor in the Social Sciences at Harvard University.

Early life and education
Rosenberg was born in New York City on November 11, 1936, and graduated with a Bachelor of Arts from the University of Wisconsin–Madison in 1956. He received both his master's degree (1957) and PhD (1961) from Columbia University.

Career
Rosenberg taught at the University of Pennsylvania from 1963 until 2001. In 2001, he moved to Harvard University. He served as acting chairman of Harvard's history of science department in 2003–2004.

Personal life
Rosenberg is married to Drew Gilpin Faust, the former president of Harvard University.

Honors 
In 2002, Rosenberg was elected to the American Philosophical Society.

Selected bibliography

Further reading

References

External links
Harvard University Department of the History of Science

Harvard University faculty
Historians of science
University of Wisconsin–Madison alumni
Columbia University alumni
American medical historians
University of Pennsylvania faculty
1936 births
Living people
Members of the American Philosophical Society
Members of the National Academy of Medicine